The siege of Longwy was a military conflict during the Franco-Prussian War, which took place from January 16 to the 25th, 1871, in the Longwy which was near the border of Belgium and Luxembourg. (Under a Personal Union with the Netherlands) After the artillery fire from the Prussian army, the siege ended with the defenders of Longwy under the command of Colonel Massaroly surrendering to Prussia under the command of Colonel Von Cosel. With this victory, the Prussian army captured many prisoners and cannons (many of which were damaged) of the enemy. This was one of the consecutive victories of the German army in a short period of time during the war. The town of Longwy was badly damaged during the siege.

The Battle
During the Sieges of Montmédy and Mézières, Prussian soldiers were dispatched to observe the detachment in Longwy, and sometimes carry out a campaign against the franc-tireur's of France. Communication between the franc-tireur soldiers and French troops stationed in Longwy led to the officer commanding the fort to know the movements of the enemy. Faced with this situation, he sent two battalions to hold back the Prussian detachments at Tellancourt and Frenois la Montague. Although the Prussians were raided and the French took a number of prisoners, the French were defeated overnight on December 26 and 27, 1870 . Initially, the German army formed a siege detachment of Longwy consisting of infantry and cavalry of the Landwehr militia led by Major Count Von Schmettau, but later, the armies were in charge of the siege. Longwy arrived. From the end of November, the Prussian army under the command of Colonel Von Cosel blockaded Longwy, and Georg von Kameke assumed command of the 14th Infantry Division. In the Prussian siege corps, Major Wolf was the commander of the artillery force, and Colonel Schott was entrusted with the management of construction works for the Prussian siege. Between January 16 and 19, 1871, to keep the French garrison unaware of the German preparations for the attack, and even to keep the French from grasping the construction of Building German batteries, the German field batteries took positions supported by the area opposite the fort, and opened fire on Longwy. This first artillery attack caused panic among the townspeople, and the French garrison took up arms until they were exhausted. And, on January 19, the Germans launched their artillery bombardment.

After strengthening the defense, the French in the fortress launched a counterattack. Thanks to its high terrain and fortified stone fortifications, Longwy stood up to German bombardment. On the 22nd of January, however, the French were unable to prevent the Germans from building their own horizontal trenches, and on that day the Prussian Artillery reaped the rewards. The artillery battle between the two factions continued for several days. In the last days, the German shelling became fierce, pushing the French into chaos. Finally, on January 24, when the Germans were preparing for the widening of the horizontal trench of their own, the French requested a ceasefire to negotiate their surrender. On the morning of January 25, the French army at Longwy formally surrendered. During this period, the French army was defeated everywhere, and 3 days after the fall of Longwy, the French capital Paris also fell into a similar situation.

References

Bibliography
 Monday, November 7, 1870
 Longwy - Encyclopedia Britannica, 2008.

1870 in France
Longwy
Longwy
Longwy
Longwy
January 1871 events